Franciska Gaal (born Franciska Silberspitz, 1 February 1903 – 13 August 1972) was a Hungarian cabaret artist and film actress of Jewish heritage. Gaal starred in a popular series of European romantic comedies during the 1930s. After attracting interest in Hollywood she moved there and made three films.

Early years
Born in Budapest, Gaal was the last of the 13 children of a Jewish family. She studied at the Stage Academy in Budapest in 1919 and by 1920 appeared in theaters in that city.

Early career

She was groomed by Joe Pasternak as a singer to become a very popular stage and cabaret performer in Central Europe in the 1920s and 1930s.

She made her first film appearances in some Hungarian silent films of the early 1920s, but her cinema career didn't take off until the arrival of sound.

Hollywood
After appearing in several films made in Hungary, Germany and Austria, two of which were directed by Henry Koster, she came to Hollywood to star in Cecil B. De Mille's epic adventure film The Buccaneer (1938), opposite Fredric March. She followed this with the comedy The Girl Downstairs (also 1938) with Franchot Tone, a remake of her Austrian success Catherine the Last. In 1939, Gaal co-starred with Bing Crosby in the musical Paris Honeymoon.

Later life
She returned to Hungary in 1940 because of her mother's illness and remained there for the duration of World War II.

In 1946, she began work on a new film in Budapest the Soviet-backed Renee XIV with Johannes Heesters and Theo Lingen, but filming was halted during production and was never completed, as another film , also with Theo Lingen and Hans Moser, where she had to play the protagonist role. She moved back to the United States in 1947 with her Budapest-born attorney husband Francis de Dajkovich (died in 1965), but her return attracted little interest in Hollywood. In 1951, she came to Broadway to replace Eva Gabor in The Happy Time.

Death 
Gaal died of thrombosis in New York City.

Filmography

References

Bibliography
 Bock, Hans-Michael & Bergfelder, Tim. The Concise CineGraph. Encyclopedia of German Cinema. Berghahn Books, 2009.

External links
 
 
 Photographs of Franciska Gaal

1903 births
1972 deaths
Hungarian Jews
Hungarian film actresses
Hungarian silent film actresses
Hungarian stage actresses
Hungarian emigrants to the United States
Actresses from Budapest
20th-century Hungarian actresses